Darreh Badam-e Sofla or Darreh Badam Sofla may refer to:
 Darreh Badam-e Sofla, Isfahan
 Darreh Badam-e Sofla, Kermanshah